Mind Your Manners may refer to:
 Mind Your Manners (film), a 1953 instructional short produced by Coronet Films
 "Mind Your Manners" (Chiddy Bang song) (2011)
 "Mind Your Manners" (Pearl Jam song) (2013)
 Mind Your Manners (series) featuring Sara Jane Ho (2022)

Television episodes
 "Mind Your Manners" (Wimzie's House), a 1996 episode
 "Mind Your Manners" (Arthur), a 2007 episode
 "Mind Your Manners" (Jim Henson's Pajanimals), a 2013 episode

See also
 Manners
 Politeness